Euseius batus is a species of mite in the family Phytoseiidae.

References

batus
Articles created by Qbugbot
Animals described in 1988